The metaltails are a group of hummingbirds in the genus Metallura. The species are distributed along the Andes.

Taxonomy and species list
The genus Metallura was introduced by the English ornithologist John Gould in 1847. The type species was subsequently designated as the black metaltail.

The genus contains nine species:
 Scaled metaltail (Metallura aeneocauda)
 Violet-throated metaltail (Metallura baroni)
 Fiery-throated metaltail (Metallura eupogon)
 Perija metaltail (Metallura iracunda)
 Neblina metaltail (Metallura odomae)
 Black metaltail (Metallura phoebe)
 Coppery metaltail (Metallura theresiae)
 Tyrian metaltail (Metallura tyrianthina)
 Viridian metaltail (Metallura williami)

References

 
Taxonomy articles created by Polbot